The 2019 IPSC Rifle World Shoot II was held in Karlskoga, Sweden between 3 and 10 August. The match consisted of 30 stages over six days, and over 650 competitors Jarkko Laukia from Finland took gold in the Open division, which was the largest division of the match.

History 
Originally, the 2018 IPSC European Rifle Championship was to be held in Karlskoga in the summer of 2018, but had to be postponed to 2019 due to the 2018 Sweden wildfires. After an application to the international association for practical shooting, the Match Category was upgraded to a World Championship, making the match one of the largest shooting competitions ever held in Sweden. The match had a capacity of approximately 750 competitors.

Karlskoga is known for being the home town of Nobel Prize founder Alfred Nobel. The venue of the match, Villingsberg's shooting range (Villingsbergs skjutfält), is owned by the Swedish Armed Forces, and the yearly Swedish Defence Forces' Practical Rifle Championship was also held in conjunction with the World Championship.

The match had stable weather conditions.

Results

Open 
The Semi Auto Open division had the largest match participation with 531 registered competitors (79.4 %). Jarkko Laukia from Finland won the Open division after having worked up a solid lead early in the match. Laukia was one of the favorites before the championship along with his experienced Finnish teammate and reigning European champion Raine Peltokoski and reigning world champion Teemu Rintala. Peltokoski managed to close in much of Laukia's lead during the final day of shooting and finished second place at 98.57%. Third place was taken by Vadim Mikhailov from Russia at 94.62%, passing reigning champion Teemu Rintala who ended up in fourth with 94.41% (0.21% behind Vadim).

Individual

Teams Open

Standard 
The iron sighted Standard division had the second largest match participation with 97 registered competitors (14.5 %). Sami Hautamäki won Standard with a decisive margin of near nine percent down to the next Standard competitor. In the unofficial Combined Scoring Across all Divisions, this would have put Sami at an impressive 22nd place with 86.07% of Open division winner Jarkko Laukia. The fight for the remaining podium places was a close race until the end, and ended with Joseph Easter from USA taking second place at 91.08%, while reigning champion Håvard Østgaard from Norway took third place at 90.16% of the winning score, only 0.9% behind second place.

Individual

Manual Open 
The Manual Action Open division had the third largest match participation with 29 registered competitors (4.3 %). A triple Swedish win in the Manual Open individual classification was ensured by Swedish shooters Jiro Nihei, Stilianos Simeonidis and Erik Bjälkvall The Manual Open division was a close race until the last days of the match, and the top 5 being competitors finished within about 2.3% of each other. The Swedish team, consisting of the three plus Dan Liljeström, also took gold in the Manual team classification.

Individual

Manual Standard 
The Manual Action Standard division had 12 registered competitors (1.8 %).

Individual

Shoot-Off side event 
The shoot-off side event is an audience friendly one-against-one elimination cup held on 10 August, the day after the Main Match was finished. The top 8 overall finishing athletes from the Main Match as well as the top 8 category athletes within in each division were eligible for qualification.

The Shoot-Off was broadcast live online on Facebook, and was recorded by Sveriges Television, the Swedish national public television broadcaster.

See also 
 IPSC Rifle World Shoots
 IPSC Shotgun World Shoot
 IPSC Handgun World Shoots
 IPSC Action Air World Shoot

References

 IPSC Rifle WS 2019 Manual | PractiScore Results
 IPSC Rifle WS 2019 Semi-Auto | PractiScore Results

External links 
 Official Match Webpage of the 2019 IPSC Rifle World Shoot 

2019
Shooting competitions in Sweden
International sports competitions hosted by Sweden
IPSC Rifle World Shoot
IPSC Rifle World Shoot
IPSC Rifle World Shoot